Interstate 60 (also known as Interstate 60: Episodes of The Road) is a 2002 American independent road film written and directed by Bob Gale, in his directorial debut, and starring James Marsden, Gary Oldman, Amy Smart, Christopher Lloyd, Chris Cooper and Kurt Russell, with a cameo by Michael J. Fox.

Plot 
The opening introduces O.W. Grant, who carries a pipe in the shape of a monkey-head. He demonstrates his mysterious powers in an encounter with a businessman, when granting the man's wish results in the businessman being hit by a truck. O.W. Grant stands for One Wish Grant.

Neal Oliver aspires to be an artist, despite the lack of support from his domineering father and analytical girlfriend. At a party for his 22nd birthday, O.W. Grant is the waiter who serves the cake. After Neal blows out the candles, he says he wished for an answer to his life. His father responds by handing him an admission letter to law school. As the family goes outside to look at the red convertible that Neal's dad bought him, a bucket falls onto Neal's head, knocking him out.

Neal wakes up in the hospital, where a doctor named Ray comes in and does a quick sight test using playing cards. Neal has to name the suit on the cards. Neal asks if he got it right, and Ray points out that the cards actually had red spades and black hearts, emphasizing that things aren't always what they seem.

After getting out of the hospital, Neal sees the mystery woman that he's been dreaming about in a billboard advertisement, but the billboard company insists that the billboard is blank. When Neal checks the billboard, he sees a new picture of the beautiful blonde, this time with a framed inscription "Call 555-1300". Neal calls the number, and a recorded message tells him that he has an appointment at 555 Olive Street, Suite 1300.

At the appointment, he again meets Ray, who gives him a package to deliver to a Robin Fields in a town called Danver in Colorado (not "Denver"). Ray tells him that he'll find Danver by taking Interstate 60.

With no Interstate 60 on the roadmap, Neal sets out west and encounters O.W. Grant on the roadside. Grant gives Neal directions to the unlisted Interstate 60, and on his journey, Neal meets various characters including a man who can consume unnatural quantities of food and drink; a promiscuous woman looking for perfect sex; a lonely mother looking for her son, who is living in a city where the population is addicted to a government-controlled drug; a dying ex-advertiser who is on a crusade to punish dishonesty; and Mrs. James, who runs the Museum of Art Fraud that actually contains real masterpieces posing as fakes.

When Neal reaches the town of Morlaw, where all citizens are lawyers who spend their days suing each other, he finally finds Lynn, the imprisoned mystery woman he has been dreaming about and painting. Lynn explains that she met O.W. Grant and wished to find the right guy. They spend the night together at the "Fork in the Road" motel. Neal also makes a painting of the motel. Neal leaves to deliver the package in Danver, while Lynn stays behind.

On the radio, Neal hears a report of a reported murderer on the loose, and the description matches his car. He abandons his vehicle to hitchhike. Arriving in Danver, Neal meets "Robin Fields", who turns out to be O.W. Grant. After opening the package (which holds a replacement monkey-head pipe for O.W.'s broken one), Grant uses his magic powers to "warp" Neal back in time, where he wakes up in the hospital before he first encountered Ray.

Leaving the hospital, Neal confronts his father and asserts his right to live his life without his father's interference. His sister takes him to an art gallery where Neal sees his painting of the "Fork in the Road". A girl who resembles Lynn talks to him about commissioning him to do a series of paintings on roadside motels and diners.

Cast

Release

Home media

Deleted scenes
The DVD includes several deleted scenes and the "bridges" where they would be placed in the film. They include:

 Neal visits an AAA office where he seeks information about Interstate 60 that the service representative repeatedly tells him does not exist. The man explains the American Interstate Highway System to Neal. Neal discovers that if I-60 did exist, it would be oriented west to east and be north of Interstate 40 and south of Interstate 70.
 When told by the man in the bar about O. W. Grant at the film's beginning, a waitress tells Neal that she had never seen the man before but he had won a large amount of bets by consuming large quantities of alcohol in a brief time without throwing up or urinating. This is the same man who appears later in a diner and makes similar bets that he can eat large amounts of food without releasing them through similar processes. The man admitted he acquired this quality through a wish from O.W. Grant but did not enjoy it, because in addition to being able to eat without stopping, he now must do so to avoid starving.
 Neal meets his father in his office saying that he doesn't want to be in a pigeon hole. His father says that everyone in the world is in a pigeon hole, even starving artists; there are good pigeon holes and bad pigeon holes so it is better to be in a good one.
 At the beginning of his road journey, Neal receives a call on his car phone but shuts it off narrating that the only freedom left in the 21st Century is to be incommunicado.
 After leaving the hospital at the end of the film, Neal breaks up with his girlfriend who calls him a loser and that artists starving for their work only exist in the previous century.

Reception
Robert Koehler, writing in Variety, criticized the film's "juvenile obviousness" and says the themes do not feel genuine.

Review aggregation website Rotten Tomatoes lists 4 reviews, and reports 3 positive and 1 negative review.

See also
 List of American films of 2002

References

External links 
 
 

2002 films
2000s road comedy-drama films
American road comedy-drama films
Canadian sex comedy films
2000s sex comedy films
Canadian road comedy-drama films
Films scored by Christophe Beck
Fireworks Entertainment films
2002 directorial debut films
2002 independent films
2002 comedy films
2002 drama films
2000s English-language films
Films with screenplays by Bob Gale
2000s American films
2000s Canadian films
Films set in St. Louis